This is a list of books written by black authors that have appeared on The New York Times Best Sellers list in any ranking or category.

The New York Times Fiction Best Seller list, in the Combined Print & E-Book Fiction category.

See also
 American literature
 African-American literature
 Lists of The New York Times Fiction Best Sellers
 Lists of The New York Times Non-Fiction Best Sellers

References

The New York Times Best Seller list
African-American literature
Lists of African-American people
Black